Whirlwind (Spanish: Torbellino) is a 1941 Spanish comedy film directed by Luis Marquina and starring Estrellita Castro, Manuel Luna and Tony D'Algy. It was made by Spain's largest film company of the era CIFESA.

Synopsis 
The young Sevillian Carmen arrives at a decrepit radio station that is going through bad times with the desire to succeed in this medium. Thanks to her, the station will get a highly rated prize.

Cast

References

Bibliography
 Bentley, Bernard. A Companion to Spanish Cinema. Boydell & Brewer 2008.

External links 

1941 films
1941 comedy films
Spanish comedy films
1940s Spanish-language films
Films directed by Luis Marquina
Spanish black-and-white films
Cifesa films
1940s Spanish films